The Simon Bradstreet House is a historic house built in 1738 located at 1 Mechanic Street, at the corner of Pearl Street, in Marblehead, Massachusetts.  It is a contributing building in the National Register of Historic Places-listed Marblehead Historic District. The house was erected by the Rev. Simon Bradstreet, the great grandson of the last bay colony governor. and the second minister of the Second Congregational Church.

The house is noted to be one of the "more substantial" Georgian style buildings in the district, being a five-bay, two-and-a-half story structure featuring dormers, a pedimented entry, and a gambrel roof, in contrast to lesser three-bay structures.

On January 4, 1738, Simon Bradstreet was ordained and received £140 from the General Court, which had been voted to compensate Marblehead for the loss of his predecessor Rev. Edward Holyoke, who left to become the president of Harvard College.  These funds were used to construct the house.  He served as minister from 1738 to 1771.  Bradstreet graduated from Harvard university in 1731 and gave the valedictory oration.

Simon Bradstreet was replaced as minister by Isaac Story, Story was introduced to his congregation in Marblehead by Ebenezer Pemberton in his sermon to the community.  Story married the daughter of Bradstreet (Rebecca Bradstreet) and moved into the house.  Story was born in 1749 and a native of Boston, a graduate of the College of New Jersey in 1768. He was the minister of the Second Congregational Church of Marblehead in Marblehead, Massachusetts, from 1771-1802. Story was acquainted with and corresponded with several of the founding fathers, including George Washington, John Adams, Thomas Jefferson, and James Madison. Story died in 1816.

Story's sermons were mentioned in the diary of John Quincy Adams.  Although Story's tenure at Marblehead was lengthy, his relationship with the congregation became increasingly strained and he resigned his pastorate in 1802. Following his resignation, he wrote Thomas Jefferson several times requesting a civil appointment. He was made a commissioner of bankruptcy in 1802, only to be informed by Thomas Jefferson that his appointment was a mistake and was intended for Joseph Story, his nephew.

The Cambridge room in Cambridge, MA received a collection of letters between Story and Washington and Jefferson that are in excellent condition and are available for the public to research.

Chance Bradstreet, the African American slave that was a subject of the "within these walls" exhibit at the National Museum of American History was born in this home in 1762.  He was later sold to Abraham Dodge of Ipswitch by Isaac Story.  A copy of the agreement between Isaac Story and Abraham Dodge to lease Chance is shown below.

It is also the house that William Story, Esq, the father of Reverend Isaac Story, resided at the time of his death.  William was the Clerk of the Admiralty, prior to the American revolution, and at the time of the stamp act being enacted his office and later the home of Thomas Hutchinson was entered on the evening of August 26, 1765 by a crowd of angry citizens and vandalized.  Possibly the attack on Story, was a carefully calculated effort to destroy records of debt and other incriminating evidence against Massachusetts merchants.  But the indisputable fact was that William Story, who stood with Sam Adams in 1763, stood with Thomas Hutchinson in 1765.  He was also a client of John Adams when we was practicing law in Boston

One of William Story's sons Dr. Elisha Story was a participant in the Boston Tea Party and also moved to Marblehead, where the home still stands at 102 Washington St.  One of William Story's grandchildren, Joseph Story, went on to become an Associate Justice of the Supreme Court.

References

Sources

 (text document available for download here click on "NR" button, although accompanying photos are not available there)

Historic district contributing properties in Massachusetts
Houses completed in 1738
Houses in Marblehead, Massachusetts
Houses on the National Register of Historic Places in Essex County, Massachusetts